Melchior Rudolf Bürgin (born 17 October 1943) is a former Swiss rower who competed at the 1964, 1968 and 1972 Summer Olympics.

Bürgin partnered Martin Studach in the double sculls rowing for Switzerland at the 1964 Summer Olympics when they came fourth.  Over next three years, Bürgin and Studach dominated the double sculls scene. In 1965 they won the Double Sculls Challenge Cup at Henley Royal Regatta  and the European Championships. In 1966 they won the World Championships. They won the European Championships and the double sculls at Henley again in 1967. Bürgin and Studach rowed in the double sculls  for Switzerland at the 1968 Summer Olympics, but at the altitude in Mexico Studach suffered a collapse through over-exertion in the heats. Bürgin went two more rounds with substitute Hans Ruckstuhl.

Burgin won the double sculls at Henley again in 1969 partnering Denis Oswald. Bürgin competed for Switzerland at the 1972 Summer Olympics in the Single scull and reached the final to come sixth.

Burgin was a long-time employee of Stämpfli, a Swiss boat building company, and took over it in the 1980s when Alfred Stämpfli retired.

References

External links
 

1943 births
Living people
Swiss male rowers
Olympic rowers of Switzerland
Rowers at the 1964 Summer Olympics
Rowers at the 1968 Summer Olympics
Rowers at the 1972 Summer Olympics
World Rowing Championships medalists for Switzerland
European Rowing Championships medalists